The discography of the British new wave band Visage consists of five studio albums, eight compilation albums, one EP and nineteen singles. Formed in 1978, the band released their first single "Tar" on the short-lived Radar Records label in 1979, before signing to Polydor Records in 1980. Their second single, "Fade To Grey", was released soon afterwards and became an international hit. After three studio albums and several personnel changes, the group disbanded in 1985 though a new line-up emerged in the 2000s, again led by vocalist Steve Strange. In 2013, the band released a new album, Hearts and Knives, the first new Visage album for 29 years. The following year, the band released Orchestral, a partly live album featuring various classic Visage songs remade with a symphony orchestra. The band's final studio album, Demons to Diamonds, was released in November 2015 (released posthumously following Strange's death in February that year).

Albums

Studio albums

Live albums

Remix albums

Compilation albums

EPs

Singles

Promotional singles

Videos

Video albums

Music videos

Notes

References

External links
 Visage on AllMusic
 Visage on Discogs

Discographies of British artists
Pop music group discographies
New wave discographies